Mars Bank is a bank located throughout the north Pittsburgh, Pennsylvania area.  The headquarters of the bank is located in the borough of Mars.  There are five branches located at various locations in lower Butler County, and upper Allegheny County.  
Butler County
Cranberry Office, Cranberry Township, Pennsylvania
Heritage Creek Office, Adams Township, Pennsylvania
Mars Office, Mars, Pennsylvania
Penn Office, Penn Township, Pennsylvania
Allegheny County
Richland Office, Richland Township, Pennsylvania

External links 
Mars Bank website

Banks based in Pennsylvania
Banks established in 1900
Mars, Pennsylvania